Shaka Ponk (sometimes abbreviated as SHKPNK) is a French electro rock band formed in Paris in 2004. They mix different forms of popular music into their songs in addition to world music, although predominantly with an electronic and experimental rock sound. Their lyrics are mostly in English, though they sometimes sing in French and Spanish.

History
Shaka Ponk is a Paris-based band that blends rock, electronic, punk rock, funk rock, and hip hop. Their live shows combine digital animation with an energetic display from the band members.

Shaka Ponk got its start between Paris and Berlin in 2005 from a concept that brings together music, imagery, and energy. The former web designer and frontman of the group, Frah, along with guitarist CC, came up with a project that combined conventional rock-n-roll elements (dirty guitar riffs and beats) with techniques such as VJing, which mixes sounds and images around an animated monkey character named Goz who is considered as much a part of the group as the other members. Since then, the band has been active online creating videos and motion graphic work along their conceptual style, releasing videos on their online channel "Monkey TV".

The band released their debut album Loco Con Da Frenchy Talkin''' in 2006 and followed up in 2009 with Bad Porn Movie Trax, under the French record label Tôt ou tard (Ben Howard, Patrick Watson). This album spawned the singles "How We Kill Stars" and "Do".

Shaka Ponk performed in New York City for the first time in October 2009 in the celebrated CMJ Musical Festival and on November 7, AOL chose the track "How We Kill Stars" as the Music Video of the Day. The band released Bad Porn Movie Trax in the United States on March 1, 2010.

In 2011 Shaka Ponk added a female vocalist, Samaha Sam, and released their album The Geeks and the Jerkin' Socks in June, 2011.

The band released two albums simultaneously in 2014, titled The White Pixel Ape (Smoking Isolate to Keep in Shape) and The Black Pixel Ape (Drinking Cigarettes to Take a Break).
Their latest album, The Evol, came out in 2017.

Band membersCurrent Frah – vocals (2004–present)
 C. C – guitars (2004–present)
 Steve – keyboards (2004–present)
 Mandris – bass (2008–present)
 Ion – drums (2008–present)
 Samaha Sam – vocals (2011–present)Other Goz – digitally created monkey serving as the band's mascot, sometimes credited as a band member (2004–present)Past'''
 Thias – bass (2004–2008)
 Bobee O.D – drums (2004–2008)

Discography

Studio albums

EPs

Reissues

Live albums

Singles

*Did not appear in the official Belgian Ultratop 50 charts, but rather in the bubbling-under Ultratip charts.

References

External links
 

Musical groups from Paris
Musical groups established in 2004
English-language singers from France
MTV Europe Music Award winners